Hans Jonsson may refer to:
Hans Jonsson (ice hockey)
Hans Jonsson (footballer), Swedish footballer